Ivan Blatný (December 21, 1919, Brno, Czechoslovakia – August 5, 1990, Colchester, United Kingdom) was a Czech poet and a member of Skupina 42 (Group 42).

Life
Blatný, the son of the writer Lev Blatný, was a member of the Skupina 42 (Group 42 - association of Czech modern artists).

In March 1948, after the communist seizure of power in his native country, Blatný left his country - just one of many figures in Czech Literature who chose to emigrate rather than go underground. However, he found life in exile difficult, as did many other émigré Czech writers such as Ivan Diviš. During his subsequent life in the United Kingdom, he spent time in various mental hospitals, suffering from paranoid fear that StB agents will kidnap him back to Czechoslovakia.

From 1984 until shortly before his death, he lived in a retirement home in Clacton-on-Sea. A plaque commemorating his stay can be seen on the wall of the Edensor Care Home in Orwell Road. His ashes were taken to the Central Cemetery in Brno.

In 2017 a new road on the site of the old St Clements Hospital in Ipswich was named Ivan Blatny Close in memory of the one time resident.

Works
At the beginning of his career, Blatný mostly wrote using conventional rhyming and rhythmic forms such as alexandrine quatrains, most notably in the Brno Elegies (Czech, Melancholické procházky; Prague: Melantrich, 1941). The correct translation of the Czech title is 'Melancholic Walks', but Blatný's original title Brněnské elegie was forbidden by the war-time censor for its suggestion that the poet might have been regretful about the German invasion of Czechoslovakia. The poems themselves make no reference whatsoever to contemporary events, but concentrate on Brno and its hinterland, with a beautiful hypnotic lyricism.

Publications
 Melancholické procházky (Prague: Melantrich, 1941)
 Tento večer (1945)
 Hledání přítomného času (1947)
 Stará bydliště (1979)
 Pomocná škola Bixley (1979; Praha: KDM 1982)
 Ivan Blatný: The Drug of Art. Selected Poems, ed. Veronika Tuckerová (New York: Ugly Duckling Presse, 2007). Translations by Anna Moschovakis, Matthew Sweney, Justin Quinn, Veronika Tuckerová, Alex Zucker.

Criticism
 Nenik, Francis, The Marvel of Biographical Bookkeeping. Translated from German by Katy Derbyshire, Readux Books 2013, Sample.
 Hejda, Zbyněk, 'Passer-By: The Poetry of Ivan Blatný'. Metre 12 (Autumn 2002): 171-84.
 See also, Ivan Blatný: The Drug of Art (2007) for essays by Josef Škvorecký, Veronika Tuckerová and Antonín Petruželka.
 Review of The Drug of Art, by Benjamin Paloff, The Nation (December 24, 2007)
 Review of The Drug of Art, by David Wheatley, Contemporary Poetry Review'' (October 2008)

See also

 List of Czech writers

References

External links
 Edensor Care Home and location of plaque

1919 births
1990 deaths
Czech poets
Czech male poets
Group 42
Recipients of Medal of Merit (Czech Republic)
Masaryk University alumni
20th-century Czech poets
20th-century male writers
Writers from Brno
Czechoslovak emigrants to the United Kingdom
Czechoslovak defectors
Czechoslovak exiles